Jurassic 5 is the debut album by American hip hop group Jurassic 5. The material from the Jurassic 5 EP plus a few additional tracks were repackaged as an album and released by Pan Records as Jurassic 5 in 1998.

NME named it the 9th best album of 1998.

Background
The correct title is simply Jurassic 5, although in some listings it is referred to wrongly as the Jurassic 5 LP, as "LP" confusingly appears on the album sleeve (including the CD version) artwork, which was used to distinguish it from the Jurassic 5 EP.

The Jurassic 5 logos on both the album and the EP were designed by Chali 2na.

Track listing
All tracks produced by DJ Nu-Mark and Cut Chemist.

The album is sometimes listed with a track entitled "Cuts and Scratches" inserted before the last track.

References

External links
 

1998 debut albums
Jurassic 5 albums